The 1964 Jacksonville State Gamecocks football team represented Jacksonville State College (now known as Jacksonville State University) as a member of the Alabama Collegiate Conference (ACC) during the 1964 NAIA football season. Led by 18th-year head coach Don Salls, the Gamecocks compiled an overall record of 4–4–1 with a mark of 3–0 in conference play, and finished as ACC champion. At the conclusion of the season, Salls retired and defensive coordinator Jim Blevins was promoted as his successor as head coach of the Gamecocks.

Schedule

References

Jacksonville State
Jacksonville State Gamecocks football seasons
Alabama Collegiate Conference football champion seasons
Jacksonville State Gamecocks football